Ichifusa Dam  is a gravity dam located in Kumamoto Prefecture in Japan. The dam is used for flood control and power production. The catchment area of the dam is 157.8 km2. The dam impounds about 165  ha of land when full and can store 40200 thousand cubic meters of water. The construction of the dam was started on 1953 and completed in 1959.

See also
List of dams in Japan

References

Dams in Kumamoto Prefecture